Shyam Sundarpur Patna High School,  established in 1952,  is a higher secondary school located on the bank of river Kangsabati in Shyamsundarpur Patna (near Panskura), Purba Medinipur, West Bengal, India..

About School
The school follows the course curricula of West Bengal Board of Secondary Education (WBBSE) and West Bengal Council of Higher Secondary Education (WBCHSE) for Standard 10th and 12th Board examinations respectively.

See also
Education in India
List of schools in India
Education in West Bengal

References

External links

High schools and secondary schools in West Bengal
Schools in Purba Medinipur district
Educational institutions established in 1952
1952 establishments in West Bengal